McConnel may refer to:

McConnel (surname)
Electoral district of McConnel, an electoral district of Queensland, Australia
Mount McConnel, a mountain of Larimer County, Colorado, United States
McConnel Islands, islands of Graham Land, Antarctica

See also
McConnell (disambiguation)